Babar, also variously spelled as Baber, Babur, and Babor is a male given name of Pashto, and Persian origin, and a popular male given name in Pakistan. It is generally taken in reference to the Persian babr (Persian: ببر), meaning "tiger". There is a similar name in connotation to the Arabic male given form and generic name of the animal by the name "Nimr" (Arabic: نَمِر namir) which means "yellow-black stripped cat", i.e. "tiger".

The word repeatedly appears in Ferdowsi's Shahnameh and was borrowed into the Turkic languages of Central Asia. Thackston argues for an alternate derivation from the PIE word "beaver", pointing to similarities between the pronunciation Bābor and the Russian bobr ("beaver").

The most famous bearer of this name was Zahiruddin Muhammad Babur, known popularly as Babur, a prince of the Timurid dynasty who founded the Mughal Empire, and the name is popular in Pakistan, Afghanistan, as well as Muslim communities in South and Central Asia.

People
 Babur (1483–1530), also spelled Baber or Babar, Turkic ruler of present-day India and founder of the Mughal Empire which encompassed territories outside of India.
 Babar Ahmed (director), Pakistani-born American film director
 Babar Ali (disambiguation)
 Babar Ali (born 1975), Pakistani actor
 Babar Ali (cricketer) (born 1986), Pakistani cricketer
 Babar Ali (teacher), Indian educator
 Babar Ali Khan (fl. 1793–1810), Nawab of Bengal, Bihar, and Orissa
 Babar Ali Khan Mohmand (born 1983), Pakistani politician
 Babar Awan (born 1958), Pakistani writer and politician
 Babar Azam (born 1994), Pakistani cricketer
 Babar Bhatti (born 1949), British actor
 Babar Hayat (born 1992), Pakistani-born Hong Kong cricketer
 Babar Khan, Pakistani actor and model
 Babar Khan (cricketer) (born 1993), Pakistani cricketer
 Babar Luck (born 1970), Pakistani-born British musician
 Babar Khan Ghauri, Pakistani politician
 Babar Nawaz Khan, Pakistani politician
 Babar Naeem (born 1983), Pakistani cricketer
 Babar Rehman (born 1984), Pakistani cricketer
 Diana Babar, British solicitor
 Fahad Babar (born 1992), Pakistani-born American cricketer
 Farhatullah Babar, Pakistani politician
 Ilyas Babar (1926–2002), Indian athletic coach
 Lutfozzaman Babar, Bangladeshi politician
 Naseerullah Babar (1928–2011), Pakistani general and cabinet minister
 Wali Khan Babar (1982–2011), Pakistani journalist
 Zulfiqar Babar (born 1978), Pakistani cricketer (Bowler)

Fiction
 Babar the Elephant, fictional character from a French children's book series

References

Sources